Hisham al-Ghazzi (Arabic: هشام الغزي) (born 1923) is a Syrian lawyer, former deputy minister, and reformist Islamic thinker.

Family
The Al-Ghazzi family has lived in Damascus since the fourteenth century and is noted for a long line of scholars and judges.

Biography
Born in 1923, Al-Ghazzi attended and graduated from the Arab Institute of Law  (currently the Faculty of Law of Damascus University).  Following a spell in legal practice, he worked at the Syrian Ministry of Finance, (1947–1986) occupying such positions as Director of Public Revenues, Deputy Minister, and Head of the Special Petroleum Board, establishing a reputation for scrutiny, discipline, and incorruptibility.

Thought and Ideology
In a series of books on modern and traditional Islam, Al-Ghazzi challenged conventional interpretations of key Qur'anic verses and the legitimacy and coherence of much of the Hadith. He revitalized and redefined concepts like al-ghā’iyyah (the purpose and benefit to be discovered behind creation and the making of laws), īlāf (human fellowship and the exchange of mutual support and benefits as a fundamental human institution), tahāfut al-turāth (the incoherence of traditionalism), and al-insān al-dhamīr (the human being as defined and informed by Conscience). These he used in arguments against doctrinal and institutional oppression, blind imitation, and nihilism and in defence of the freedom of human thought and action. His legal training and economic know-how as well as his early socialist sympathies and knowledge of Western authors give a distinctive flavour (but also tension) to his writings, increasingly dealing with a broader human rather than exclusively Islamic condition.

Main publications
He is the author of several books   
Buna al-Islām (The structures and institutions of Islam), Dar Usama, Damascus, 1992
Al-Mithāq al-Islāmi bi-l‘awdah ila-l-Qur’ān (The Islamic Charter based on the Qur'an), Al-Dar al-Wataniyyah al-Jadidah, Damascus, 2004
Al-Insān man Yakūn? (What makes Man human?), Dar Tlas, Damascus, 2008

References

1923 births
Possibly living people
Syrian Muslim scholars of Islam